Lala Dmitrievna Kramarenko (born December 6, 2004) is a Russian individual rhythmic gymnast. She is the 2019 junior world champion in ball and clubs and the 2018 European junior champion in ball and ribbon. At the 2021 European Championships she won team gold. She is also a three-time junior national all around champion (2017-2019) and a two-time national all around silver medalist (2020-2021).

Personal life 
Kramarenko was born in Moscow into a sporting family. Her father, Dmitry Kramarenko, is a retired Azerbaijani football goalkeeper and currently works as an academy coach at CSKA Moscow; her mother Irina was a biathlete. Her paternal grandfather is Sergey Kramarenko, a Soviet football goalkeeper. Additionally, Kramarenko's twin sister, Diana, plays tennis.She started Rhythmic Gymnastics at age 3, with her sister, who no longer practices the sport.

Career

Junior 
Kramarenko took up rhythmic gymnastics at age three in Baku, Azerbaijan. She briefly competed for Azerbaijan in novice tournaments from 2011-2013. In 2014 she moved from Baku to Novogorsk to train with coach Lyaysan Savitskaya and began competing in internal Russian tournaments. In 2016, she won gold at the Championship of Moscow in the all-around.

2017 
In the 2017 season, Kramarenko won gold in the all-around at the 2017 Russian Junior Championships in Kazan. She debuted in her first Junior Grand Prix in Moscow, where she won the all-around gold. 

The next competition was at the International Tournament of Lisbon, where she won 4 gold medals in the all-around, hoop, ball, and clubs. Kramarenko then won gold in the all-around at the Junior Grand Prix Marbella as well as team gold (together with Polina Shmatko). May 5–7, Kramarenko competed at the 2017 Sofia Junior World Cup and won gold in the all-around; she also swept the gold medals in all 4 apparatus finals in hoop, ball, clubs and ribbon. 

On October 12–14, Kramarenko competed with new programs and routines in preparation for the 2018 Season at the "2017 Hope of Russia" where she finished 4th in the all-around behind Polina Shmatko. 

On 4-6 November, Kramarenko won the all-around gold at the annual "Russian-Chinese Youth Games". She qualified to all 4 event finals: won bronze in the hoop and ribbon finals, silver in clubs, and placed 9th in ball.

2018 
On February 2–4, Kramarenko defended her title at the 2018 Russian Junior Championships, winning the gold medal ahead of Dariia Sergaeva. She also won three gold medals - team, ball and ribbon - at the Junior European Championship in Guadalajara, Spain.

2019 
Kramarenko became the all-around champion at the Russian Junior Championships.

In July, Kramarenko won three gold medals at the 1st Junior World Championships: ball, clubs, and team all around. She shared the team all around gold with Dariia Sergaeva, Anastasia Simakova, Aleksandra Semibratova, Anna Batasova, Alisa Tishchenko, Amina Khaldarova, Elizaveta Koteneva and Dana Semirenko.

2020 
Kramarenko made her senior debut at the 2020 Moscow Grand Prix, securing bronze in the individual all around competition behind Dina Averina and Daria Trubnikova. At the 2020 Russian Championships she won the all-around silver medal behind Arina Averina.

2021

Kramarenko began her season competing in the 2021 Moscow Grand Prix, where she finished third in all around. She was registered to compete in the 2021 Sofia World Cup, along with Anastasia Simakova, but withdrew. 

In May at Baku, she competed at her first senior World Cup, winning silver in hoop, bronze in clubs and in bronze in all around, behind Boryana Kaleyn. In June, Kramarenko competed in the 2021 European Championships in Varna, Bulgaria, finishing 5th in the hoop final and winning team gold with Dina and Arina Averina. In July, she competed in the 2021 Minsk World Cup Challenge, achieving gold in ribbon, bronze in hoop and silver in ball, clubs and all around, behind Alina Harnasko and in front of Anastasia Salos. She also competed in the 2021 Moscow World Cup Challenge, replacing Arina Averina due to injury, winning silver in all events and all around, behind Dina Averina and in front of Ekaterina Vedeeneva. Irina Viner selected Kramarenko, along with Ekaterina Selezneva and Daria Trubnikova, as the Olympic reserve athletes for the Tokyo 2021 Olympic Games. 

In September, Lala competed at the Brno Grand Prix, where she won full gold ahead of Daria Trubnikova and Irina Annenkova, and won gold in the ball and club final, silver in the hoop final, and bronze in the ribbon final. Also, in early October she competed in the Moscow Olympico Cup. In mid-October she competed in the Marbella Grand Prix, also achieving full gold, ahead of Viktoriia Onoprienko and Anastasia Simakova, in the apparatus finals, she won 3 golds and silver in the club final. She was again chosen as the reserve of the Averinas sisters, this time for the 2021 World Championship, in Kitakyushu, Japan, which took place at the end of October. In the Barcelona International City Tournament, she took the full gold in front of Daria Trubnikova and Alexandra Agiurgiuculese.

2022

Just recovering from Covid, Kramarenko started her season competing at the 2022 Moscow Grand Prix, where she won silver in the all-around, behind fellow Russian Teammate Dina Averina and ahead of Arina Averina. She also won gold in the Ball and clubs  Final and Silver in the ribbon final.   

At the 2022  Russian Rhythmic Gymnastics Championship she won bronze in the All around, behind Dina & Arina Averina.

Routine music information

Competitive highlights

References

External links
 
 Lala Kramarenko profile 
 

Russian rhythmic gymnasts
2004 births
Living people
Gymnasts from Moscow
Russian sportspeople of Azerbaijani descent
Medalists at the Junior World Rhythmic Gymnastics Championships